Taham may refer to:
Taham, Gilan (تهام - Tahām)
Taham, Zanjan (تهم - Taham)
Taham Rural District, in Zanjan Province